Joseph Geurts (6 July 1939 – 7 December 2012) was a Belgian cyclist. He competed in the individual road race at the 1960 Summer Olympics.

References

External links
 

1939 births
2012 deaths
Belgian male cyclists
Olympic cyclists of Belgium
Cyclists at the 1960 Summer Olympics
Sportspeople from Hasselt
Cyclists from Limburg (Belgium)